The year 2011 was the 2nd year in the history of the Road Fighting Championship, an MMA promotion based in South Korea. 2011 started with Road FC 002: Alive and ended with Road FC 005: Night of Champions.

List of events

Road FC 005: Night of Champions 

 ROAD FC 005: Night of Champions was an MMA event held by the Road FC on December 3, 2011, at the Jangchung Gymnasium in Seoul, South Korea.

Results

Road FC 004: Young Guns 

 ROAD FC 004: Young Guns was an MMA event held by the Road FC on October 3, 2011, at the Grand Hilton Seoul Convention Centre in Seoul, South Korea.

Results

Road FC 003: Explosion  

 ROAD FC 003: Explosion was an MMA event held by the Road FC on July 24, 2011, at the Grand Hilton Seoul Convention Centre in Seoul, South Korea.

Results

Road FC 002: Alive 

 ROAD FC 002: Alive was an MMA event held by the Road FC on April 16, 2011, at the Seoul Fashion Center in Seoul, South Korea.

Results

See also
 List of Road FC events
 List of Road FC champions
 List of current Road FC fighters
 List of current mixed martial arts champions

References

Road Fighting Championship events
2011 in mixed martial arts
2011 in South Korean sport
2011 in Asian sport